The 2011 County Championship season, known as the LV County Championship for sponsorship reasons, was the 112th cricket County Championship season. It was contested through two divisions: Division One and Division Two. Each team played all the others in their division both home and away. Lancashire won Division One. The top two teams from Division Two were promoted to the first division for the 2012 season, while the bottom two sides from Division One were relegated. Aggregate attendances rose 9% to 531,000.

Teams

 Team promoted from Division Two
 Team relegated from Division One

Standings

Results summary

Division One

Division Two

Results

Division One

April

May

June

July

August

September

Division Two

April

May

June

July

August

September

References

External links
 County Championship Division One, 2011 on ESPN Cricinfo
 County Championship Division Two, 2011 on ESPN Cricinfo

County Championship seasons
County Championship